Gaganyaan 1 will be the first uncrewed test flight of the Gaganyaan program, with launch planned for 2023.

Background
The launch was originally scheduled for December 2020, then in December 2021, but it was delayed due the COVID-19 pandemic. The flight plan was finally ready by April 2022 and the launch is expected to take place in 2023, after the TV-D1 and TV-D2. It was proposed in April 2022 that the crew module should be depressurized.

Mission objectives
The Gaganyaan spacecraft will be launched by a human-rated LVM 3 from Satish Dhawan Space Centre and inserted into a 170 x 408 km orbit. The circularisation maneuver will be performed at the third orbit. The landing should follow the same pattern as the TV-D1.

After this mission ISRO will perform four more abort tests before launching Gaganyaan 2, carrying the humanoid robot Vyommitra.

References

Bibliography

Gaganyaan
Test spaceflights
2023 in spaceflight
2023 in India